Maryam Zandi (born 1946 in Gorgan, Iran) is an Iranian documentary photographer and author. She is best known for her photographs during the Iranian Revolution.

Biography 
She spent her school years in Gorgan and then graduated from University of Tehran in the School of Law & Political Sciences. Beginning her photography career in 1970, she was awarded with the first prize of the ministry of art and culture's national photography competition. In 1972 she joined Iranian national TV-Radio as a photographer and later by initial publications of “Tamasha” magazine, she became Iranian Television and Tamasha magazine's public relations photographer.

Maryam Zandi remained with National Television for the next twelve years. Within this time she also began capturing photos of the revolution in 1979 as well as many other photographic experiences. Her first significant photography project (“Chehreh-ha: Portraits”) was formed within these years after revolution (1981) which by the beginning of the Iran-Iraq war and her trip to France (1986–1989) remains incomplete.

However her first photography book (“Turkmen & Sahra”: Turkmen & Desert) was published in 1982. This is the first collection portraying Turkmens of Iran and also the first collection which by the means of photographs intends to study and explore one of the Iranian ethnic groups. Her university thesis is also a sociological research about Turkmens of Iran.

After returning to Iran in 1989, work on the incomplete project (“Chehreh-ha”: Portraits) is resumed. This work is still ongoing and after 26 years a unique extensive photography archive of famous and influential contemporary Iranian elites (as well as some non-Iranians) in the fields of literature, visual arts, cinema, theatre, architecture, music and politics is shaped. Maryam Zandi has published more than ten photography books until now.

Her last publication is the “1979 Revolution” photography book which is a collection of incidents happening around the time of the Iranian revolution in 1979.

Since 2000 Maryam Zandi's photographs in collaboration with “Ebrahim Haghighi” (Graphic designer) have designed and published more than 80 different types of artistic calendars. Most of these calendars are the first of their kind containing various photographs related to Iran. By publishing these calendars, Maryam Zandi has taken a huge influential step in improving the imagery culture and photographic taste of the Iranian people by taking these diverse range of photographs from every corner of the country to people's household.

In 2005 Maryam Zandi along with twelve other famous and influential Iranian photographers were selected by the “Society of Iranian Photographers” to establish the “National Iranian Photographers’ Society (NIPS)”. In 2009 by the first meeting of the board of directors, Maryam Zandi –achieving the highest vote– was elected as the first chairman of the board. She resigned from NIPS in 2013.

In 2010 she was invited to receive the “first degree medal of art” from the president, however she refused the medal in protest to lack of freedom and professional dignity of photographers in Iran at the time. Same year, she received an independent award as the most influential photographer of the year in the “Social Documentary Photography Festival” for supporting the rights of Iranian photographers (“Sheed Award”). In 2014 she won the same prize again, for publishing the book “1979 Revolution”.

Maryam Zandi has also been active in designing and making glass-works. She has held three exhibitions portraying her glass art. Within the past 40 years, Maryam Zandi has been one of the most active, dynamic and influential photographers of the country.

Publications

 1983 Turkman and the desert. B&W. Tehran.
 1991 The portraits of the book,'Stories from Iran. Mage Publishers, Washington DC. B&W
 1993 Portraits (1) A Portfolio of Iranian Literati  B&W. Tehran.
 1995 Portraits (2) A Portfolio of Iranian Artists B&W. Tehran.
 1997 Portraits (3) A Portfolio of Iranian Film and Theater Celebrities B&W . Tehran.
 2001 Akkashi (PotoPaints)  with E.Haghighi. Publisher:Haft Rang, Tehran.
 2004 Portraits (4) A Portfolio of Iranian Literati Vol. 2. B&W. Publisher:Haft Rang, Tehran.
 2006 Iran! my beloved flower! Color. Publisher: Nazar publication, Tehran.
 2007 Portraits of The Book of Iranian Architects. Publisher: Nazar publication and Iran Architectural Pride worthies Foundation.
 2008 Blue with Red line. Color. Publisher: Nazar publication, Tehran.
 2014 The Revolution of IRAN 79 (photo collection ), Black and white, Publisher: Nazar.
 2017 Portraits (5) A Portfolio of Iranian Musicians. Black and white, Publisher: Maryam Zandi, Tehran.
 2018 … I Feel Sorry for Mr. Dugger; Poems by Maryam Zandi. Publisher: Maryam Zandi, Tehran.
 2019 My Hair in the Wind (photo collection ), Black and white, Publisher: Nazar.
 2019 The Government of 80 (photo collection ), Black and white, Publisher: Nazar.
 Since 2000: Calendars and Postcards in various themes.

Solo exhibitions
 1973 Black and white, Qandriz Gallery, Tehran.
 1974 Asian Games, color, Qandriz gallery, Tehran.
 1978 Woman in step with the Revolution, Ministry of Labor and Bagh-e Ferdows, Tehran.
 1979 Form and Tradition in Turkman-Sahra, color, Negarestan Museum, Tehran.
 1989 Portrits from the Iranian Literati Scene, Private showing, Tehran.
 1991 Portrits from the Iranian Literati Scene, Hilton Hotel, Washington D.C.
 1992 Portrits from the Iranian Literati Scene, George Washington University, Washington D.C.
 1993 Portraits of Contemporary Iranian Artists, Barg Art Gallery, Tehran.
 1998 A Selection of Portraits, Golestan Gallery, Tehran.
 1998 Another Glance to the Nature, Haftsamar Gallery, Tehran.
 2002 Color and Glass,(glass works), Golestan Gallery, Tehran.
 2003 Color and Glass,(glass works), Golestan Gallery, Tehran.
 2007 The Photos, Day Galleey, Tehran.
 2008 Afghanestan, Day Gallery, Tehran.
 2009 The Photos, Golestsn Gallery, Tehran.
 2011 The Gifts of the earth, Gallery No 6 Tehran
 2012 The Crows, Golestan Gallery, Tehran
 2013 Glass works, Golestan Gallery, Tehran
 2016 The Flowers, Golestan gallery, Tehran

See also
 Culture of Iran
 Islamic art
 Iranian art
 Iranian art and architecture
 List of Iranian artists

References

External links
 Maryam Zandi Official Website
  Chilick Photo Agency
 Maryam Zandi's galleries at Kargah
 Maryam Zandi Photo Exhibition - November 2007

1947 births
Living people
20th-century Iranian women artists
21st-century Iranian women artists
20th-century women photographers
21st-century women photographers
Iranian photographers
People from Gorgan
Iranian women photographers
University of Tehran alumni
Documentary photographers
Women photojournalists